The 1988–89 Ball State Cardinals men's basketball team represented Ball State University as a member of the Mid-American Conference during the 1988–89 NCAA Division I men's basketball season. Led by second-year head coach Rick Majerus, Ball State played stifling defense en route to one of the best seasons in the school's history, including a school-record 29 wins and the first NCAA Tournament win in program history. The Cardinals won MAC regular season and tournament titles, advanced to the second round of the NCAA tournament, and finished the season with a 29–3 record (14–2 MAC).

Roster

Schedule and results

|-
!colspan=9 style=| Non-conference regular season

|-
!colspan=9 style=| MAC regular season

|-
!colspan=9 style=| MAC tournament

|-
!colspan=9 style=| NCAA tournament

Source

Rankings

References

1988–89 Mid-American Conference men's basketball season
1988-89
1988 in sports in Indiana
1989 in sports in Indiana
1989 NCAA Division I men's basketball tournament participants